The Yellow Henry Gang was a 19th-century New Orleans street gang during the early 1870s and late 1880s.

A particularly violent gang in the underworld of New Orleans, the gang was largely made up of thieves and murderers. Originally led by a man known only as Turpo, the gang was taken over by "Yellow" Henry Stewart following Turpo's arrest and eventual imprisonment for murder in 1877.

Under Henry's leadership, the gang reached its peak following a number of successful burglaries, armed robberies and extortion attempts. The gang attracted many of the cities prominent criminals including expert garroters Joseph Martin and Crooked Neck Delaney, Charles "Prussian Charley" Mader, George Sylvester, Garibaldi Bolden, murderers Red and Blue Haley, Pat Keeley and cop killer Frank Lyons.

In 1884, Henry was arrested for robbery along with three other gang members, and in July 1886 while in prison he would die from malaria. Henry had long suffered from the tropical disease which had tinted his skin yellow, hence his nickname.

The gang was briefly reformed in 1888, following the escape of Frank Lyons, however he was quickly arrested and returned to prison. After two years, Lyons would be pardoned by Louisiana Governor Francis T. Nicholls in 1890 and again resumed the criminal activities with the gang until 1892, when New Orleans police arrested Lyons for the murder of a police officer and sentenced to life imprisonment with the Yellow Henrys' disbanding soon after.

References 

Former gangs in New Orleans
Organized crime gangs
People in 19th-century Louisiana
19th century in New Orleans